Bryter Layter is the second studio album by English folk singer-songwriter Nick Drake. Recorded in 1970 and released on 5 March 1971 by Island Records, it would be his last album to feature backing musicians, as his next and final studio album, Pink Moon, would have Drake perform all songs solo.

Content and production 

Like Five Leaves Left, the album contains no unaccompanied songs: Drake was accompanied by part of the British folk rock group Fairport Convention and John Cale from The Velvet Underground, as well as Beach Boys session musicians Mike Kowalski and Ed Carter. Arranger Robert Kirby says that Drake intended the instrumentals to evoke Pet Sounds. Initially scheduled for release in November 1970, with UK promotional copies being sent out at the time, dissatisfaction with the artwork meant that the album was held over into the New Year.

Reception 

Contemporary reviews were mostly positive. In Sounds Jerry Gilbert called the album "superb" and said, "On their own merits, the songs of Nick Drake are not particularly strong, but Nick has always been a consistent if introverted performer, and placed in the cauldron that Joe Boyd has prepared for him, then things start to effervesce." Gilbert praised the "splendid arrangements" of Robert Kirby, and said that the songs "take time to work through to the listener, with help from the beautiful backing which every track receives". Lon Goddard of Record Mirror was also impressed by Drake's guitar technique and Kirby's arrangements, and "Nick isn't the world's top singer, but he's written fantastic numbers that suit strings marvellously. Definitely one of the prettiest (and that counts!) and most impressive albums I've heard ... Happy, sad, very moving." "The Disc Panel" in Disc and Music Echo stated that Drake "sings his own very personal songs in a strange, deep vaseline voice, probably more suited to crooning, accompanied at times by really funky backing" and called the record "an extraordinarily good hefty folk album". However, Andrew Means of Melody Maker described the album as "late-night coffee'n'chat music" and said, "This is a difficult album to come to any firm conclusion on", stating that the reaction depended on the listener's mood and that "the 10 tracks are all very similar – quiet, gentle and relaxing."

Mojo called the album "certainly the most polished of his catalogue". Alternative Press called it "[one] of the most beautiful and melancholy albums ever recorded".

In his book Never a Dull Moment: 1971 – The Year That Rock Exploded, David Hepworth described the song "At the Chime of a City Clock" as "the perfect soundtrack for the dispensing of a cup of tea in a polysytrene cup, marrying sound and image in a way that made me unsure whether I was watching a commercial or actually in a commercial".

Legacy 

In 2000, Q placed Bryter Layter at number 23 in its list of the 100 Greatest British Albums Ever. It ranked at number 14 in NME's list of the Greatest Albums of the '70s.

It was voted number 306 in the third edition of Colin Larkin's All Time Top 1000 Albums (2000).

In 2003, the album was ranked number 245 on Rolling Stone magazine's list of the 500 Greatest Albums of All Time.

Track listing

Personnel 
Nick Drake performs vocals and guitar, except where indicated otherwise.

 "Introduction"
 Nick Drake – guitar
 Dave Pegg – bass
 Dave Mattacks – drums
 Strings arranged by Robert Kirby
 "Hazey Jane II"
 Dave Pegg – bass
 Dave Mattacks – drums
 Richard Thompson – lead guitar
 Brass arrangement by Robert Kirby
 "At the Chime of a City Clock"
 Ray Warleigh – alto sax
 Dave Pegg – bass
 Mike Kowalski – drums
 Strings arranged by Robert Kirby
 "One of These Things First"
 Paul Harris – piano
 Ed Carter – bass
 Mike Kowalski – drums
 "Hazey Jane I"
 Dave Pegg – bass
 Dave Mattacks – drums
 Strings arranged by Robert Kirby
 "Bryter Layter"
 Nick Drake – guitar
 Lyn Dobson – flute
 Dave Pegg – bass
 Dave Mattacks – drums
 "Fly"
 John Cale – viola and harpsichord
 Dave Pegg – bass
 "Poor Boy"
 Ray Warleigh – alto sax
 Chris McGregor – piano
 Dave Pegg – bass
 Mike Kowalski – drums
 Pat Arnold and Doris Troy – backing vocals
 "Northern Sky"
 John Cale – celeste, piano and organ
 Dave Pegg – bass
 Mike Kowalski – drums
 "Sunday"
 Nick Drake – guitar
 Ray Warleigh – flute
 Dave Pegg – bass
 Dave Mattacks – drums
 Strings arranged by Robert Kirby

Production
 Joe Boyd – producer
 John Wood – engineer
 Nigel Waymouth – sleeve design and front cover photograph
 Keith Morris – back cover photograph

Release history

References 
The cover of the North American version of the 2003 album Akuma no Uta by Japanese metal band Boris pays tribute to Bryter Layter.
The song "Fly" was featured in Wes Anderson's The Royal Tenenbaums.
The song "One of These Things First" was featured on the Grammy award-winning Garden State soundtrack, compiled by Zach Braff. The song was also used in the 2008 film Seven Pounds starring Will Smith.
The song "Northern Sky" was featured in the 2001 film Serendipity, is frequently featured in the show This Is Us on NBC, and was chosen as a track by Sue Perkins whilst on BBC Radio 4 programme Desert Island Discs.
Bryter Layter features prominently in the 2020 novel Summer by the Scottish author Ali Smith, when the character Grace hears Bryter Layter ("pretty flute, very 1970s") being played on a cassette machine in a church, leading to a conversation about Nick Drake with the carpenter.

Notes

External links 
 Album online on Radio3Net a radio channel of Romanian Radio Broadcasting Company
 
 Lyrics

Nick Drake albums
1971 albums
Island Records albums
Albums arranged by Robert Kirby
Albums produced by Joe Boyd